South Korea participated at the 2018 Summer Youth Olympics in Buenos Aires, Argentina from 6 October to 18 October 2018.

Medalists

Competitors

Archery

South Korea qualified two archers based on its performance at the 2017 World Archery Youth Championships.

Individual

Team

Athletics

Dancesport

South Korea qualified one dancer based on its performance at the 2018 World Youth Breaking Championship.

 B-Girls - Yell

Fencing

South Korea qualified four athletes based on its performance at the 2018 Cadet World Championship, but only 3 participated.

 Boys' Foil - Kwon Jungsung
 Girls' Épée - Lim Taehee
 Girls' Sabre - Lee Jueun

Gymnastics

Artistic
South Korea qualified two gymnasts based on its performance at the 2018 Asian Junior Championship.

 Boys' artistic individual all-around - 1 quota
 Girls' artistic individual all-around - 1 quota

Rhythmic
South Korea qualified one gymnast based on its performance at the 2018 Asian Junior Championship.

 Girls' rhythmic individual all-around - 1 quota

Golf

Individual

Team

Judo

Team

Modern pentathlon

South Korea qualified two pentathletes based on its performance at the Asian/Oceanian Youth Olympic Games Qualifier. South Korea qualified a second male based on its performance at the 2018 Youth A World Championship. The nation must choose between the two boys.

 Boys' Individual - Shin Hyoseop or Moon Juseong
 Girls' Individual - Yoon Yangji

Eventually no South Korean modern pentathletes competed.

Roller speed skating

South Korea qualified two roller skaters based on its performance at the 2018 Roller Speed Skating World Championship.

 Boys' combined speed event - Cheon Jongji
 Girls' combined speed event - Lee Yerim

Shooting

South Korea qualified one sport shooter based on its performance at the 2017 Asian Championships.

 Boys' 10m Air Pistol - 1 quota

Individual

Mixed

Sport climbing

South Korea qualified one sport climber based on its performance at the 2017 World Youth Sport Climbing Championships.

 Boys' combined - 1 quota (Seongmin Eog)

Swimming

Table tennis

South Korea qualified one table tennis player based on its performance at the Asian Continental Qualifier. South Korea also qualified a female table tennis player based on its performance at the Road to Buenos Aires (Asia) series.

 Boys' singles - Cho Daeseong
 Girls' singles - Choi Haeeun

Taekwondo

Boys

Girls

Triathlon

South Korea qualified one athlete based on its performance at the 2018 Asian Youth Olympic Games Qualifier.

Individual

Relay

References

2018 in South Korean sport
Nations at the 2018 Summer Youth Olympics
South Korea at the Youth Olympics